Imperial overstretch, also known as Imperial overreach, describes the situation in which an empire extends itself beyond its military-economic capabilities and often collapses as a result. The idea was popularised by Yale University historian Paul Kennedy in his 1987 book The Rise and Fall of the Great Powers.

Arguably, this was true of the Roman Empire, which was strong and effective in the first and early second centuries CE, despite a few setbacks (Germany in 9CE; Scotland in the 80s CE) but lost territories after that (e.g. Dacia and Mesopotamia) and could not keep the Saxons, Huns and other "barbarians" out in the 4th and 5th centuries. Clearly, this was also true of the Napoleonic Empire, which made rapid gains by conquest in the first decade after Napoleon became emperor of France, but became over-extended militarily when it attempted to conquer Russia in 1812. Likewise the Axis powers all overextended themselves during World War II:  Nazi Germany, waging war since 1939 in Western and Eastern Europe, was encircled, invaded, and fell in 1945; Imperial Japan led a total war in China and the Pacific Ocean; and fascist Italy, opening in 1940 simultaneous fronts in Africa, the Balkans, and the Mediterranean, suffered setbacks and fell in 1943.

Paul Kennedy's view has been criticised from many directions, including by the postmodern historiographer Hayden White, economic historian Niall Ferguson and Marxist writers such as Perry Anderson and Alex Callinicos.

See also 
 Societal collapse

References 

Political terminology